Michail Grigoriadis was the Ottoman-appointed Prince of Samos from 1900 to 1902.

An incompetent prince, he achieved very little during his reign and was dismissed by the Ottoman Sultan after a reign of only two years.

Princes of Samos
20th-century rulers in Europe
People from Kayseri